The Bellavita Shopping Center is a luxury shopping mall in Xinyi Special District, Taipei, Taiwan that opened on September 21, 2009. It is rated amongst the top luxury malls in Asia.

History
Bellavita Shopping Center, which costs about NT$9 billion and took 5 years to build, was completed and opened in 2009. Its behind-the-scenes business unit, Chun Yee Co., Ltd., is jointly operated by the wife of Quanta Computer’s vice chairman and president C.C. Leung, vice chairman and general manager of Quanta Group, and three daughters. The name "Bellavita" was taken from Italian and means "a beautiful life", which is suitable for its concept of providing a better life for the shoppers.

Facilities
Jointly designed by the P&T Group and Chu-Yuan Lee, the 9-storey building adopts a European architectural style that combines nature, sunlight, water and plants, with a fountain with changing lights, specially planted palm trees from the Middle East and a colourful garden in the atrium.

On level B2 of the mall is the Gourmet Food Hall, which has an oyster bar. The very top floors are home to some of the very finest food in all of Taipei, including the Japanese cuisine of Ton 28 on level 6 and the Taipei branch of L'Atelier de Joël Robuchon on the fifth floor.

Gallery

See also
 List of tourist attractions in Taiwan
 List of shopping malls in Taipei

References

External links

 

2009 establishments in Taiwan
Shopping malls in Taipei
Shopping malls established in 2009